Czapury  is a village in the administrative district of Gmina Mosina, within Poznań County, Greater Poland Voivodeship, in west-central Poland.

The village has a population of 1,025.

References

Czapury